The 1912–13 season was Galatasaray SK's 9th in existence.
The league cancelled by the Unions Club due to the Balkan Wars. Galatasaray played only friendly matches. On 15 August 1913, Galatasaray SK was officially registered as a club. Milo Bakic, one of the founders of Galatasaray SK, died in a war.

Squad statistics

İstanbul Football League

Friendly Matches
Kick-off listed in local time (EEST)

Match officials
Assistant referees:
Unknown
Unknown

Match rules
90 minutes

Match officials
Assistant referees:
Unknown
Unknown

Match rules
90 minutes

References
 Atabeyoğlu, Cem. 1453-1991 Türk Spor Tarihi Ansiklopedisi. page(64).(1991) An Grafik Basın Sanayi ve Ticaret AŞ

External links
 Galatasaray Sports Club Official Website 
 Turkish Football Federation - Galatasaray A.Ş. 
 uefa.com - Galatasaray AŞ

Galatasaray S.K. (football) seasons
Turkish football clubs 1912–13 season
1910s in Istanbul